D58  may refer to:

 D58 (Croatia), a state road in Croatia
 New South Wales D58 class locomotive
 HMS Cardiff (D58)